The Dutch Eerste Divisie in the 1957–58 season was contested by 32 teams, divided in two groups. Willem II and SHS won the championship.

New entrants and group changes

Group A
Promoted from the 1956–57 Tweede Divisie:
 RBC Roosendaal
Relegated from the 1956–57 Eredivisie:
 Willem II
Entered from the B-group:
 AGOVV Apeldoorn
 DFC
 EDO
 SBV Excelsior
 VV Helmond
 Vitesse Arnhem
 FC Volendam

Group B
Promoted from the 1956–57 Tweede Divisie:
 Leeuwarden
Relegated from the 1956–57 Eredivisie:
 FC Eindhoven
Transferred from the A-group:
 HFC Haarlem
 Helmondia '55
 KFC
 Limburgia
 De Volewijckers
 FC Wageningen
 Xerxes

Eerste Divisie A

Championship play-off

Willem II were promoted to the Eredivisie.

Eerste Divisie B

See also
 1957–58 Eredivisie
 1957–58 Tweede Divisie

References
Netherlands - List of final tables (RSSSF)

Eerste Divisie seasons
2
Neth